Munibung Hill is the name of a hill in New South Wales which is in the suburbs of Macquarie Hills, Boolaroo, Speers Point and Warners Bay.

The name is believed to have been derived from an Aboriginal word meaning "fruit".

Munibung Hill – meaning ‘fruit’ – was gazetted on 23 December 1977, but we cannot establish who proposed the name and why it was chosen i.e. presuming there was bush tucker present on Munibung Hill which species or variety of fruit was it; and why not Kona-konaba, since the Hill was well known as a source of ochre.

Fivefold Vision 
This Five-fold Vision sets out a plan for Munibung Hill to be reinstated as a culturally significant site and for the reintroduction of some plant and animal species that were present pre-European settlement.

 Geological and Cultural Heritage Park — Meeting and sharing place
 Conservation area / Nature reserve — A refuge, a sanctuary, a safe house
 Visitor Economy — Lookouts with outlooks
 Rest and Recreation area — A breathing space, a connecting place
 Observatory and Planetarium site — Learning & research place

This extensive ongoing consultation process has demonstrated that Munibung Hill warrants a much greater level of care than she is currently receiving.

References

Hills of New South Wales